Bozoo is an unincorporated community in Monroe County, West Virginia, United States. Bozoo is north of Peterstown.

The community's name may be a corruption of the name Boisseau. 

Bozoo is a popular location for rock climbing, with both bouldering and roped climbing.

References

Unincorporated communities in Monroe County, West Virginia
Unincorporated communities in West Virginia